The Palacio de Cristal ("Glass Palace") is a 19th century conservatory located in the Buen Retiro Park in Madrid, Spain. It is currently used for art exhibitions.

The Palacio de Cristal, in the shape of a Greek cross, is made almost entirely of glass set in an iron framework on a brick base, which is decorated with ceramics. Its cupola makes the structure over 22 metres high. When it was erected, glass and iron construction on a large scale was already to be seen in Madrid at Delicias station (1880), the work of a French architect; however, the curved architecture of the Palacio de Cristal is more comparable to the techniques pioneered by the British architects Joseph Paxton (who was responsible for London's Crystal Palace) and Decimus Burton (who was responsible for the Palm House at Kew Gardens). The Palacio de Cristal was, alongside the Pabellón Central, one of the main venues of the 1887 Philippines Exposition.

The cast-iron frame was manufactured in Bilbao.
The structure was designed in a way that would allow it to be re-erected on another site (as happened to the equivalent building in London).  However, the building has remained on the original site, next to a lake, and has been restored to its original appearance.  It is no longer used as a greenhouse, and is currently used for art exhibits.

Use 
The Crystal Palace belongs to the Reina Sofía Museum, and is one of its temporary exposition centres together with Velázquez Palace.

Gallery

References

Buen Retiro Park
Cast-iron architecture in Spain
Glass architecture
Tourist attractions in Madrid
Palaces in Madrid
Buildings and structures in Jerónimos neighborhood, Madrid